Syed Inayat Ali Shah (Punjabi) is a Pakistan Tehreek-e-Insaf politician from Chiniot. He remained a Member of the National Assembly of Pakistan from 2008 till 2013, elected in Elections, 2008 from NA-86 (Jhang-I). He belongs to Pakistan Peoples Party Parliamentarians.

See also 
 Chiniot
 Pakistan Tehreek-e-Insaf

References

External links
Syed Inayat Ali Shah in the list of constituency no. NA-86.

Pakistan Tehreek-e-Insaf politicians
Living people
People from Chiniot District
Punjabi people
Year of birth missing (living people)
Pakistan People's Party politicians
Pakistani MNAs 2008–2013